Bernard Davis may refer to:

 Bernard Davis (biologist) (1916–1994), American biologist
 Bernard Davis (politician), Canadian politician
 Bernard Davis (British Empire Medal holder) (1933–2015), awarded the British Empire Medal for risking his life rescuing a 3-year-old girl
 Bernard George Davis (1906–1972), American publishing executive